Turab Ali (died 5 June 2009) was a Pakistani professional footballer, who was dubbed as "Wall of China", "Pillar of Hercules” during his hey days in the 1960s.

Club career
Turab used to play as central-defender. Turab represented Dhaka and Karachi in National Championship.

National career
Turab made international debut against Burma (now Myanmar) in 1961 and six years later took over the charge of National team as 16th skipper of Pakistan Football team. He played in RCD Cup 1965 and he was captain when Pakistan defeated Saudi Arabia in Faisalabad test of 4-test Series 1967. He also showed remarkable defensive quality when Pakistan played 4th Asia Cup QR and RCD Cup in 1967 under his captaincy. His International Career Span was from 1961 to 1967.

Death
He died in Pakistan in 2009.

References

Year of birth missing
2009 deaths
Pakistani footballers
Pakistan international footballers
Association football defenders
Mohammedan SC (Dhaka) players